The Cluj-Napoca Botanical Garden, officially Alexandru Borza Cluj-Napoca University Botanic Garden, is a botanical garden located in the south part of Cluj-Napoca, Romania. It was founded in 1872 by Hungarian linguist Sámuel Brassai, known as the "Last Transylvanian Polymath". Its director in 1905 was Aladár Richter, then Páter Béla, Győrffy István, and then, in 1920, it was taken over by the local university and by Alexandru Borza.

In addition to its role as a tourist destination, the garden also serves as a teaching and research center as part of the Babeș-Bolyai University. In 2010, the Romanian Ministry of Culture and National Patrimony categorized it as a historical monument.

The garden is over 14 hectares in area, with over 10,000 plants found throughout the world. It is divided into ornamental, phytogeographic (geobotanical), systematic (taxonomical), economic, and medicinal sections. Romanian flora and vegetation are represented by plants from the Transylvanian plains, the Carpathian Mountains, Banat, etc.

Among the Botanical Garden's interesting attractions are the Japanese Garden (a garden in Japanese style, with a brook and a Japanese-style house), the Roman Garden with archeological remains from the Roman colony of Napoca, among them a statue of Ceres, goddess of cereals and bread, alongside cultivated plants that dominate contemporary Romanian agriculture. Jablonovszki Elemér was its head gardener for 45 years.

History 
After the establishment of the first universities, the existing herb gardens beside the monasteries were subordinated to them, gradually forming the true botanical gardens where the botanical sciences with their different branches became study disciplines. Likewise is the case similar with the botanical garden of Alexandru Borza of Cluj-Napoca, and its history has been tied to the Romanian University situated in the capital of Transylvania.

Precursors 
In 1872, with the founding of the Franz Josef University in Cluj, the unique botanical department was attached to a vast garden, the attachment having been orchestrated in said park by Count Mikó, the Ardelean National Museum. This was to be later transformed into a botanical garden. A rich collection of trees and shrubs formed the foundation and the promising beginning of a botanical garden. At the entrance of the park was a four-room building, which served as a Botanical Institute and office. The first director, Prof. Dr. A. Kanitz (1872-1896), failed to organize a solid institution. Despite the funds he disposed of having been of minimal value, he could hardly achieve either a systematically medicinal school or a small greenhouse for tropical plants. Consequently, more than three-quarters of space remained unsolved. In 1882, the Institute of Chemistry was built in the middle of the garden. Count Mikó's House was transformed into a Zoological Museum, rather than being used as part of a Botanical Museum. In 1897, when the second director, Prof. Dr. J. Istvánffi (1897-1901) was instated, the building of the Botanical Institute was demolished, the whole garden thereby losing its original meaning despite considerable efforts to raise the garden to Western standards. Until 1901 and the instatement of the garden's third director, Prof. Dr. Aladár Richter, who had rich experience and modern views, the Botanical Garden was endowed with a larger greenhouse. This greenhouse was raised in the outside garden, which had been abandoned until then. At that time Prof. Dr. Aladár Richter was expecting a flourishing era for this cultural institution when suddenly Prof. Apathy placed her new Zoological Institute in the middle of the botanical garden. Thus, with the Institute of Chemistry and Zoology away from its botanical institute, the Botanical Garden could no longer serve the botanical sciences seriously.

After many efforts, director Aladár Richter managed to convince the government of the need for measures to save the garden. In 1910–1912, as compensation for the museum garden, a great land for a new botanical farden was purchased. The chosen territory was corrugated and rugged, rendering it suitable for different cultures and rare landscapes. It was endowed with separate buildings for the director, staff and household.

Professor Richter retired and thus did not personally handle the arrangement of this garden. For lack of funds and initiative, Gyorffy (1913-1919) also did not handle the arrangement, but rather cultivated fruits and vegetables for hospitals and housed the Hungarian refugees in 1916 during World War I. The new Romanian administration was tasked with transforming the orchard of existing fruit trees into a true botanical garden.

Foundation and growth 
After the Great Union, a conflict emerged between the newly enlarged Kingdom of Romania and staff at the University of Cluj, which refused to recognise the authority of the Romanian state. Consequently, the university's assets were nationalised and on 12 May 1919 a committee of 14 Transylvanian specialists was appointed to administer these assets. In the area of biology this task fell to Alexandru Borza. In 1920, Borza and Kornél Gürtler devised a plan for a botanical garden.

In 1920 two neighbouring parcels separated by a creek are bought and the landscaping work begins. The marshy land hosting the parcels is drained and a diverse array of seeds are planted.

In 1923 a dam with a reservoir and a water tower are built. The water tower is accessible to the public and doubles as a panoramic viewing platform overlooking the garden. The rocky sections are landscaped for Mediterranean flora and a Japanese garden is constructed.

In 1924 a greenhouse is set up to host palm trees. New paths through the garden are constructed and paved.

The official inauguration of the garden takes place on 25 June 1925.

A series of renovation and expansion works take place throughout the 1960s. The most notable are six new greenhouses, paving the garden's main alleys, and consolidation works on the central lake's foundation.

Image Gallery

References

External links
Cluj-Napoca Botanical Garden

Botanical gardens in Romania
Tourist attractions in Cluj-Napoca
Archaeology of Romania
Roman Dacia